Nnemkadi Chinwe Victoria "Nneka" Ogwumike (born July 2, 1990) is a American basketball player for the Los Angeles Sparks of the Women's National Basketball Association (WNBA), after being drafted No. 1 overall in the 2012 WNBA Draft. Soon after being drafted, Ogwumike signed an endorsement deal with Nike. She is the older sister of Chiney Ogwumike, who also plays for the Sparks. Ogwumike was named WNBA MVP for the 2016 WNBA season and won the WNBA Finals the same year She was named to The W25 the league's list of the top 25 players of its first 25 years, in 2021.

She also plays for Dynamo Kursk of Russia Her name "Nneka" means "Mother is Supreme" in the Igbo language of Nigeria - where her family hails from. She is 6'2" and plays power forward. She attended Cy-Fair High School in Cypress, Texas and led them to a 5A State Championship in her senior season. While at Stanford University she helped the Cardinal reach the Final Four four times. Ogwumike was elected President of the WNBA Players Association in 2016 and was re-elected to a new three-year term in 2019.

High school
Ogwumike was named a WBCA All-American. She participated in the 2008 WBCA High School All-America Game, where she scored 17 points, grabbed 6 rebounds, and earned MVP honors for the White team. She averaged 16.8 points, 8.0 rebounds, 1.8 assists, 2.4 steals and 0.8 blocks per game during the 2007–08 season at Cy-Fair High School.

College

Ogwumike chose Stanford over Baylor, Duke, Connecticut, Tennessee and Notre Dame. She was a member of USA Under 18 Team that won gold in Argentina on July 23–27, 2008. Nneka tallied 20 points and 15 rebounds in the championship game of the Under-18 FIBA Americas. She led team USA to a 5–0 record while leading the team in scoring and rebounding. She was named MVP of this tournament in Argentina.

Nneka had also played with her sister, Chiney Ogwumike in Stanford.

In a 100-80 victory over Oregon on January 23, 2010, Ogwumike set a new Cardinal record for rebounds in a game with 23.

On December 20, 2011, Ogwumike scored a career-high 42 points on 19 for 27 shooting while also grabbing 17 rebounds in a 97–80 win over the sixth-ranked Tennessee Lady Vols.

On January 7, 2012, Ogwumike surpassed both the 2,000 point and the 1,000 rebound thresholds for her career with a 33-point, 16 rebound performance against Oregon State.

Ogwumike left the Stanford Cardinal as the second all-time leading scorer for the women's basketball program, behind only Candice Wiggins.

USA Basketball
Ogwumike was a member of the USA Women's U18 team which won the gold medal at the FIBA Americas Championship in Buenos Aires, Argentina. The event was held in July 2008, when the USA team defeated host Argentina to win the championship. Ogwumike helped the team win all five games, starting all five games and leading all scorers with 12.6 points per game. She was also the leading rebounder with 8 per game. Ogwumike recorded 15 rebounds in the final game against Argentina, an U18 record.

Ogwumike continued on to the USA Women's U19 team which represented the US in the 2009 U19 World's Championship, held in Bangkok, Thailand in July and August 2009. Although the USA team lost the opening game to Spain, they went on to win their next seven games to earn a rematch against Spain in the finals, and won the game 81–71 to earn the gold medal. Ogwumike started all nine games and was the team's leading scorer, with 13.6 points per game. She was the leading rebounder with almost ten per game, and was named to the all-tournament team.

Ogwumike played on the team presenting the US at the 2011 World University Games held in Shenzhen, China, along with her sister, Chiney Ogwumike . The team, coached by Bill Fennelly, won all six games to earn the gold medal. Ogwumike averaged 13.2 points and 5.7 rebounds per game, both second place on the team behind Elena Delle Donne.

Ogwumike had also played for Team USA at the 2014 FIBA World Championship for Women, helping Team USA beat Spain 77–64 in the gold medal game.

WNBA career

On April 16, 2012, the Los Angeles Sparks picked Ogwumike first overall in the 2012 WNBA Draft. She became the second player from Cypress-Fairbanks High School to be drafted No. 1 overall into the WNBA behind Lindsey Harding in 2007.

On July 12, 2012, Ogwumike set a career-high in rebounds with 20 to go along with 22 points in a 77–74 win over the eventual WNBA champion Indiana Fever. On September 13, 2012, she scored a season high 30 points on 10 of 15 shooting to go along with 11 rebounds in an 86–77 win over the Chicago Sky. In the regular season finale on September 20, 2012, Ogwumike matched her teammate Candace Parker for team highs in both points and rebounds with each player earning 22 and 11, respectively, in a 92–76 win over the defending WNBA champion Minnesota Lynx. Ogwumike was 10 for 13 from the field.

Ogwumike was named WNBA Rookie of the Month four out of five times in her rookie season. On October 7, 2012, Ogwumike was awarded as the 2012 WNBA Rookie of the Year. It marked the fifth consecutive year that the award had been won by the first overall draft pick.

During the 2014 season, Ogwumike averaged 15.8 ppg and was voted as a WNBA All-star for the second time in her career along with her sister Chiney Ogwumike, becoming the first pair of sisters to be selected into a WNBA All-Star game.

In 2016, Ogwumike re-signed with the Sparks once her rookie contract expired. During the season, Ogwumike was named AP WNBA Player of the Year, while finishing third in the league in scoring (19.7 ppg), third in the league in rebounding (9.1 rpg) and first in field goal percentage (.665). Her season performance would also help her earn the 2016 WNBA Most Valuable Player Award. During the season, Ogwumike had set a WNBA record for most consecutive field goals made (23 consecutive field goals over three games) and set a new WNBA single-game record for most field-goal attempts without a miss in which she scored 32 points on 12 of 12 field goal shooting in a 97–73 win over the Dallas Wings. On June 30, 2016, she scored a career-high 38 points along with 11 rebounds in an 84–75 victory against the Atlanta Dream. In addition, she set the basketball record for highest true shooting percentage by reaching 73.7% during the season, becoming the most efficient shooter in the history of professional basketball. With a supporting cast of Candace Parker and Kristi Toliver, the Sparks were a championship contender in the league with a 26–8 record. With the WNBA's new playoff format in effect, the Sparks were the number 2 seed in the league with a double-bye to the semi-finals (the last round before the WNBA Finals) facing the Chicago Sky. The Sparks defeated the Sky 3–1 in the series, advancing to the WNBA Finals for the first time since 2003. In the WNBA Finals, it was the second time in league history were two teams from the same conference faced each other in the Finals due to the new playoff format. Against the championship-defending Minnesota Lynx, the Sparks won the championship in a hard-fought five-game series, winning their first championship since 2002. Ogwumike won her first career WNBA championship. In game five of the series, Ogwumike had 12 points along with 12 rebounds and scored a game-winning shot after grabbing an offensive rebound to put the Sparks up 77–76 with 3 seconds left in the game. Ogwumike became the seventh player in WNBA history to win both the regular season MVP award and a championship in the same season. 

In 2017, Ogwumike signed a contract extension with the Sparks. During the 2017 season, Ogwumike was voted into the 2017 WNBA All-Star Game, making it her fourth career all-star appearance. On August 18, 2017, Ogwumike scored a season-high 32 points along with 10 rebounds in a 115–106 double overtime victory over the Chicago Sky. By the end of the season, Ogwumike led the Sparks in scoring for the second season in a row, averaging 18.8 ppg and the Sparks finished as the number 2 seed for the second year in a row with the same record, receiving a double-bye to the semi-finals. The Sparks would go on to advance to the Finals for the second season in a row, after defeating the Phoenix Mercury in a 3-game sweep, setting up a rematch with the Lynx. However, the Sparks would lose in five games, failing to win back-to-back championships.

To start off 2018, Ogwumike scored a season-high 25 points in an 87–70 victory over the Indiana Fever. Later on in the season, Ogwumike was voted into the 2018 WNBA All-Star Game but would miss the game due to fatigue, which kept her sidelined for over a week in mid July. Ogwumike made her return on August 2, 2018, against the Minnesota Lynx and scored 15 points in a 79–57 victory. Ogwumike finished off the season averaging 15.5 ppg. The Sparks finished 19–15 with the number 6 seed in the league. In the first round elimination game, they defeated the championship-defending Minnesota Lynx 75–68. In the second round elimination game, the Sparks lost 96–64 to the Washington Mystics.

On July 4, 2019, Ogwumike scored a season-high 31 points along with 10 rebounds in a 98–81 victory over the Washington Mystics. Ogwumike would be voted into the 2019 WNBA All-Star Game, making it her 6th all-star appearance. The Sparks finished off the season as the number 3 seed with a 22–12 record, receiving a bye to the second round. In the second round elimination game, the Sparks defeated the defending champions Seattle Storm 92–69. In the semi-finals, the Sparks were eliminated in a three-game sweep by the Connecticut Sun.

In 2020, the season was delayed and shortened to 22 games in a bubble at IMG Academy due to the COVID-19 pandemic. On September 12, 2020, Ogwumike scored a season-high 24 points in a 84–70 loss to the Las Vegas Aces. Ogwumike played 18 of the 22 games (sitting out 4 games with a back injury). The Sparks finished the season 15–7 as the number 3 seed, receiving a bye to the second round, but were once again eliminated by the Connecticut Sun in the elimination game, Ogwumike was unable to play for the game due to an illness.

In January 2021, Ogwumike re-signed with the Sparks to a multi-year deal.  During the 2021 season. the WNBA's 25th, she was named to The W25 as one of the top 25 players in league history, and at the end of the season was selected for the WNBA's Kim Perrot Sportsmanship Award for the third consecutive year.

Overseas career
In the 2012–13 off-season, Ogwumike played in Poland for CCC Polkowice and won a championship with the team Since 2014, Ogwumike has played three off-seasons in Russia for Dynamo Kursk. The club won the 2017 Euroleague. In late 2017, Ogwumike returned to Dynamo Kursk for the 2017–18 WNBA off-season.

Personal life 
Ogwumike is Catholic.

Career statistics

WNBA

Regular season

|- style="text-align: Center;"
|-
| style="text-align:left;"| 2012
| style="text-align:left;"| Los Angeles
| 33 || 33 || 27.9 || .535 || .143 || .734 || 7.5 || 1.2 || 1.3 || 0.8 || 1.2 || 14.0
|-
| style="text-align:left;"| 2013
| style="text-align:left;"| Los Angeles
| 34  || 34  || 25.8 || .566 || .400 || .826 || 7.6 || 1.3 || 1.4 || 0.9 || 1.9 || 14.6
|-
| style="text-align:left;"| 2014
| style="text-align:left;"| Los Angeles
| 33 || 33 ||27.6||.520||.300||.873|| 7.1|| 1.5 ||1.7  || 0.4 || 2.0 || 15.8
|-
| style="text-align:left;"| 2015
| style="text-align:left;"| Los Angeles
| 23 || 23 ||style="background:#D3D3D3"|34.1° ||.525 ||.083|| .866|| 7.3|| 2.1 || 1.0 || 0.4 || 1.8 || 16.5
|-
|style="text-align:left;background:#afe6ba;"| 2016†
| style="text-align:left;"| Los Angeles
| 33 || 33 ||31.6||style="background:#D3D3D3"|.665° ||.615||.869|| 9.1 || 3.1  || 1.2 ||  1.1  || 2.1 || 19.7
|-
| style="text-align:left;"| 2017
| style="text-align:left;"| Los Angeles
| 34 || 34 ||30.9|| .561 ||.340|| .870 || 7.7 || 2.1 || 1.8 || 0.5 || 1.5 || 18.8
|-
| style="text-align:left;"| 2018
| style="text-align:left;"| Los Angeles
| 27 || 27||30.8|| .525 ||.346|| .816 || 6.8 || 2.0 || 1.5 || 0.4 || 1.4 || 15.5
|-
| style="text-align:left;"| 2019
| style="text-align:left;"| Los Angeles
| 32 || 32 ||27.9|| .510 ||.338 || .828 || 8.8 || 1.8 || 1.8 || 0.4 || 1.8 || 16.1
|-
| style="text-align:left;"| 2020
| style="text-align:left;"| Los Angeles
| 18 || 18 || 26.2 || .569 ||.500 || .837 || 4.8 || 1.7 || 1.1 || 0.2 || 1.6 || 13.3
|-
| style="text-align:left;"| 2021
| style="text-align:left;"| Los Angeles
| 18 || 18 || 31.7 || .532 || .367 || .800 || 6.5 || 2.7 || 1.4 || 0.3 || 2.2 || 14.5
|-
| style="text-align:left;"| 2022
| style="text-align:left;"| Los Angeles
| 34 || 34 || 31.4 || .544 || .368 || .826 || 6.6 || 2.0 || 1.6 || 0.4 || 1.8 || 18.1
|-
| style="text-align:left;"| Career
| style="text-align:left;"| 11 years, 1 team
| 320 || 319 || 29.4 || .550 || .365 || .834 || 7.4 || 1.9 || 1.5 || 0.6 || 1.8 || 16.2

Playoffs

|-
| style="text-align:left;"| 2012
| style="text-align:left;"| Los Angeles
| 4 || 4 || 25.8 || .552 || .000 || .400 || 5.3 || 0.5 || 1.0|| 0.8|| 1.2 || 9.0
|-
| style="text-align:left;"| 2013
| style="text-align:left;"| Los Angeles
| 3||3||30.3||.419|| .000 || .909||11.7||1.0||0.7||0.0 || 2.0||12.0
|-
| style="text-align:left;"| 2014
| style="text-align:left;"| Los Angeles
| 2||2||30.0||.667||.000 ||1.000||6.0||1.0||0.5||0.0||3.0||13.0
|-
| style="text-align:left;"| 2015
| style="text-align:left;"| Los Angeles
| 3||3||30.7||.600||.000 ||.833||4.3||2.0||1.0||0.3||2.3||11.7
|-
|style="text-align:left;background:#afe6ba;"| 2016†
| style="text-align:left;"| Los Angeles
| 9||9||31.4||.625||.222||.763||9.3||2.6||2.0||1.1||2.8||17.9
|-
| style="text-align:left;"| 2017
| style="text-align:left;"| Los Angeles
| 8||8||31.5||.482|| .100 ||.744||8.8||1.5||2.1||0.1||1.7||14.0
|-
| style="text-align:left;"| 2018
| style="text-align:left;"| Los Angeles
| 2|| 2 ||33.8|| .400 ||.000 || .733 || 4.0 || 1.5 || 1.5 || 0.5 || 2.5 || 13.5
|-
| style="text-align:left;"| 2019
| style="text-align:left;"| Los Angeles
| 4 || 4 ||29.1|| .592 ||.400 || .857 || 7.3 || 1.8 || 1.2 || 0.5 || 2.0 || 18.0
|-
| style="text-align:left;"| Career
| style="text-align:left;"|8 years, 1 team
|35||35||30.4||.550||.208||.763||7.8||1.7||1.5||0.5||2.2||14.4

College

Source

Awards and honors

 2021 The W25
 2021 Kim Perrot Sportsmanship Award
 2021 WNBA All-Star as member of Team USA
 2020 Kim Perrot Sportsmanship Award
 2019 Kim Perrot Sportsmanship Award
 2019 All-WNBA Second Team
 2019 WNBA All-Star
 2018 WNBA All-Star
 2017 All-WNBA Second Team
 2017 WNBA All-Defensive First Team
 2017 WNBA All-Star
2016 WNBA Champion
2016 WNBA MVP
 2016 All-WNBA First Team
 2016 WNBA All-Defensive First Team
 2015 WNBA All-Defensive First Team
2015 WNBA all star
2014 All WNBA Second Team
2014 WNBA all star
2013 WNBA all star
2012 Naismith Finalist
2012 WNBA Rookie of the Year
2012 Wooden AwardFinalist
2012 Wade Trophy Finalist
2012 AP All-America 1st Team
2012 Pac-12 Player of the Year
2012 Pac-12 All-Defensive Team
2012 Pac-12 Tournament MOP
2012 Fresno Regional MVP
2011 Naismith Finalist
2011 Wooden Award Finalist
2011 Wade Trophy Finalist
2011 AP All-America 2nd Team
2011 All-Pac-10 Team
2011 Pac-10 All-Defensive Team
2011 Pac-10 Tournament MOP
2011 Spokane Regional MVP
2010 AP All-America 2nd Team
2010 All-Final Four Team
2010 Sacramento Regional MVP
2010 Pac-10 Tournament MOP
2010 Pac-10 Player of the Year (both coaches and media)
2009 Pac-10 All-Tournament Team
2009 Pac-10 All-Freshman Team
2008 MaxPreps National Girls Athlete of the Year
2008 Gatorade National Player of the Year
2008 Texas Gatorade Player of the Year
2008 Co-Parade Magazine National Player of the Year
2008 McDonald's All-American Game Starter
2008 WBCA All-American Game West MVP
2008 EA Sports First Team
2008 Texas Ms. Basketball
2007 Texas Gatorade Player of the Year
2007 MVP End of the Trail
2007 Second Team Parade Magazine All-America
2007 First Team EA Sports All-America
2007 Texas Ms. Basketball
2006 Street and Smith All-America Honorable Mention
2006 Adidas Top Ten Underclass All-Star
2006 TGCA 5A All-State First Team
2006 All-Metro First Team
Ranked 6th best player in class by ESPN HoopGurlz
Ranked 4th best player in the class by Blue Star Basketball
Ranked 3rd best player by Rise Magazine
Ranked 2nd best player in the class by ASGR

Filmography

References

External links

USA Basketball bio
Stanford Cardinal bio
PLK profile

1990 births
Living people
African-American Catholics
All-American college women's basketball players
American expatriate basketball people in China
American people of Igbo descent
American sportspeople of Nigerian descent
American women's basketball players
Basketball players from Texas
Guangdong Vermilion Birds players
Igbo sportspeople
Los Angeles Sparks draft picks
Los Angeles Sparks players
McDonald's High School All-Americans
Medalists at the 2011 Summer Universiade
Parade High School All-Americans (girls' basketball)
People from Cypress, Texas
Power forwards (basketball)
Sportspeople from Harris County, Texas
Stanford Cardinal women's basketball players
Universiade gold medalists for the United States
Universiade medalists in basketball
Women's National Basketball Association All-Stars
Women's National Basketball Association first-overall draft picks
United States women's national basketball team players